Michael Evan Horowitz (born September 19, 1962) is an American attorney and government official. He is the Inspector General of the United States Department of Justice.

Early life and education
Horowitz is the son of Anne J. and Fred Horowitz. His father owned the women's clothing manufacturer, Paul Alfred Inc.; and his mother owned an antique store in Nyack, New York.  He earned a Bachelor of Arts, summa cum laude, from Brandeis University majoring in economics and minoring in Legal Studies. He then earned a Juris Doctor, magna cum laude, from Harvard Law School.

Career
Following law school he served as a law clerk for Judge John G. Davies of the U.S. District Court for the Central District of California. He then worked as an associate at the law firm Debevoise & Plimpton. From 1991 to 1999 he was an assistant U.S. Attorney for the Southern District of New York. From 1999 to 2002 he worked at the Department of Justice headquarters in Washington D.C., first as a deputy assistant attorney general, then as chief of staff. In 2002 he returned to private practice as a partner at Cadwalader, Wickersham & Taft, where he focused on white collar defense, internal investigations, and regulatory compliance. During this time he also served as a commissioner on the U.S. Sentencing Commission—a position for which he was confirmed by the Senate in 2003.

Inspector General for the Department of Justice
Horowitz was sworn in as the Inspector General of the United States Department of Justice on April 16, 2012. Since 2015, he has also been the chair of the Council of the Inspectors General on Integrity and Efficiency (CIGIE), an organization consisting of all 73 federal Inspectors General.

Review on FBI and DOJ actions in the 2016 election 

Horowitz announced in January 2017 that the Inspector General's office would examine evidence related to "allegations of misconduct" regarding FBI Director James B. Comey's handling of the investigation into Hillary Clinton's email practices and whether Justice Department employees leaked information improperly during the run-up to the 2016 United States presidential election. In June 2018, Horowitz released his report, concluding that Peter Strzok and other FBI employees "brought discredit to themselves" and to the agency. He found that Comey indulged in ad hoc decision making and did not follow FBI procedures, but did not find that he was motivated by any political bias.

Review on 4 FISA Applications and the Crossfire Hurricane investigation 

Another investigation into the FBI and Justice Department was launched by Horowitz in March 2018. This investigation targeted the FBI and Justice Department's filing of four FISA applications and renewals to surveil former Trump campaign adviser Carter Page and whether or not there was an abuse of this FISA process. A redacted version of the report of the investigation was released December 9, 2019. On November 18, 2019 Senator Lindsey Graham, Chairman of the Senate Judiciary Committee, announced that Horowitz would testify before the committee on December 11 regarding the investigation and provide recommendations on how judicial and investigative systems could be improved.

On December 9, 2019, Horowitz released his report stating that the FBI found 17 “basic and fundamental” errors and omissions in its applications to the Foreign Intelligence Surveillance Court (FISA Court), but did not find political bias during the investigation of Trump and Russia, nor did he find evidence that the FBI attempted to place people inside the Trump campaign or report on the Trump campaign. However, in a Senate hearing, Horowitz stated he could not rule out political bias as a possible motivation. The report found that the FBI had a legal "authorized investigative purpose and with sufficient factual predication" to ask for court approval to begin surveillance of Carter Page, a former Trump campaign adviser.

Pandemic Response Accountability Committee 
Horowitz appointed Glenn Fine to chair the Pandemic Response Accountability Committee (PRAC), but Trump removed Fine in early April 2020. That month, Horowitz became acting chair of the PRAC.

Review of the DOJ's Zero Tolerance Policy 

In January 2021, the Inspector General for the Department of Justice concluded an investigation into the "zero tolerance" policy, finding that: department leaders underestimated the difficulty of implementing it, failed to tell local prosecutors and others that children would be separated; failed to understand that separations would last longer than a few hours; and failed to halt the policy after that was discovered. The findings led Rod Rosenstein, who had been Trump's Attorney General at the time the policy was enforced, to admit that family separations "should never have been implemented".  According to an NBC News report on the investigation, "The report could provide a road map for the incoming Biden administration to investigate those responsible for a policy President-elect Joe Biden has called criminal."

Review of the DOJ on the attempts to overturn the 2020 U.S. presidential election 
After the New York Times report in January 2021 alleged that some officials in the Justice Department attempted to work with President Trump in order to overturn the election, Horowitz announced that he will open up an investigation regarding the allegation.

Personal life
In 2000, he married Alexandra Leigh Kauffman in Leesburg, Virginia. Kauffman is a former field producer for CNN covering economics and personal finance.

See also 
 
 Inspector General report on FBI and DOJ actions in the 2016 election
 Russia investigation origins counter-narrative
 Steele dossier
 Timeline of Russian interference in the 2016 United States elections
 Timeline of post-election transition following Russian interference in the 2016 United States elections
 Timeline of investigations into Trump and Russia (July–December 2017)
 Timeline of investigations into Trump and Russia (2019–2020)

References

External links

1962 births
Brandeis University alumni
Harvard Law School alumni
Living people
People associated with Cadwalader, Wickersham & Taft
People from New York City
United States Department of Justice officials
United States Inspectors General by name
People associated with Debevoise & Plimpton